The Islamic Heritage Park is a famous attraction in Kuala Terengganu, Terengganu, Malaysia. This park is located at the island of Wan Man.

History
The Islamic Heritage Park was opened on 2 February 2008.

Famous attractions
Masjid Kristal (Crystal Mosque)

Notable mosques replicas
Al-Masjid al-Nabawi, Medina, Saudi Arabia
Masjid al-Haram, Mecca, Saudi Arabia
Dome of the Rock, Jerusalem
Qolsharif Mosque, Kazan, Tatarstan, Russia
Masjid Negara, Kuala Lumpur, Malaysia
Masjid Menara Kudus, Kudus, Indonesia
Great Mosque of Xi'an, Xi'an, China
Great Mosque of Samarra, Samarra, Iraq
Pattani Mosque, Pattani Province, Thailand
Al-Hambra Mosque, Granada, Spain
Aleppo Citadel, Aleppo, Syria
Sultan Mosque, Singapore
Badshahi Mosque, Lahore, Pakistan
Silang the great garden of China
Kalyan Minaret, Bukhara, Uzbekistan
Sheikh Lotfollah Mosque, Isfahan, Iran

Other
Taj Mahal, India

Image gallery

See also
 List of tourist attractions in Malaysia

Buildings and structures in Terengganu
Kuala Terengganu
Tourist attractions in Terengganu
2008 establishments in Malaysia
Islam in Malaysia